Kale, sometimes spelt as Kayle or abbreviated from Kalen, is a Gaelic unisex given name, although it is more commonly given to males.

History 
Americanized form of German Köhl (see Kohl) or Kehl and possibly also of Kahl (compare Cale). In English it is a habitational name from the villages of East and West Keal in Lincolnshire which are named from Old Norse kjǫlr ‘ridge’.

It may also be a variant of Call. In Dutch it is a nickname from kaal ‘bald’.

In India (Maharashtra it is a descriptive nickname from Hindi kale ‘black’ (Sanskrit kāla) found among Marathas or/and Kunbis, Brahmnins and other communities. The Konkanastha Brahmins have a clan called Kale.

People

Given name
 Kale Ane, former professional American football player
 Kale Browne, actor
 Kale Cezario, Ghanaian politician
 Kale Kayihura, Ugandan lawyer, military officer and policeman
 Kale Kye-Taung Nyo, king of Ava from 1425 to 1426 
 Kale Williams, American civil rights activist

Surname
 Aderonke Kale, major-general and former commander of the Nigerian Army Medical Corps
 Jonathan Kale (born 1988), Ivorian basketball player
 Karsh Kale, musician
 Tvrtko Kale (born 1974), Croatian-Israeli footballer
 Vasant Purushottam Kale, writer

Fictional characters 
Kale (Dragon Ball), a character from Dragon Ball Super
 Kale (Lady Kale), villain in the cartoon series Princess Gwenevere and the Jewel Riders
 Kale, a character from the film A Perfect Getaway
 Jennifer Kale, a Marvel Comics character
 Kale Brecht, main character of the film Disturbia
Kale Firehart, main character of book series The Chronicles of Kale
 Kale Ingram, a character in the TV series Rubicon

See also

Kali (name)
Kalle, given name

References 

English-language unisex given names